The 1938 ICF Canoe Sprint World Championships were held in Vaxholm, Sweden, outside Stockholm, between 6–7 August 1938. This event was held under the auspices of the Internationale Repräsentantenschaft Kanusport (IRK), founded in 1924 and the forerunner of the International Canoe Federation.

The men's competition consisted of three Canadian (single paddle, open boat) and seven kayak events. Two events were held for the women, both in kayak.

This was the first championships in canoe sprint and the only one held prior to World War II which would break out the following year. It is also the only time the K-1 10000 m folding and K-2 10000 m folding events would take place in the world championships.

Medal summary

Men's

Canoe

Kayak

Women's

Kayak

Medals table

References
International Canoe Federation
ICF medalists for Olympic and World Championships - Part 1: flatwater (now sprint): 1936-2007.
ICF medalists for Olympic and World Championships - Part 2: rest of flatwater (now sprint) and remaining canoeing disciplines: 1936-2007.

Icf Canoe Sprint World Championships, 1938
ICF Canoe Sprint World Championships
ICF Canoe Sprint World Championships
Canoeing
Canoeing in Sweden
August 1938 sports events